Daddy-Long-Legs is a 1919 American silent comedy-drama film directed by Marshall Neilan, and based on Jean Webster's 1912 novel Daddy-Long-Legs. The film stars Mary Pickford.

Plot
A police officer finds a baby in a trash can, and Mrs. Lippett, the cruel matron at an orphanage where children are made to work, names her "Jerusha Abbott" (she picks "Abbott" out of a phone book and gets "Jerusha" from a tombstone). The orphan, who comes to be called Judy, does what she can to stand up for the younger children, frequently clashing with both Mrs. Lippett and the cold hearted trustees. At one point she leads a rebellion against being served prunes with every meal and at another, steals a doll from a selfish rich girl to lend to a dying orphan.

Years later, wealthy Jervis Pendleton, a mysterious benefactor, pays to send Judy, now the oldest and most talented child in the orphanage, to college. He insists, however, that Judy must never try to contact him in person. Judy calls him "Daddy-Long-Legs," and writes to him, however. Judy proves popular with her wealthier and more "aristocratic" classmates, and writes a successful book to repay "Daddy-Long-Legs" the money he spent on her. She is generally happy but misses not having any real family members to take pride in her accomplishments. Judy also finds herself caught up in a romantic triangle with the older brother of a classmate and an older man (who is, unknown to her, her mysterious benefactor). She eventually chooses the older suitor and is delighted to learn that he is her "Daddy-Long-Legs."

Cast
 Mary Pickford as Jerusha "Judy" Abbott
 Milla Davenport as Mrs. Lippett
 Miss Percy Haswell as Miss Pritchard
 Fay Lemport as Angelina Gwendolin Rosalind "Angie" Wykoff
 Mahlon Hamilton as Jarvis Pendleton
 Lillian Langdon as Mrs. Pendleton
 Betty Bouton as Julia "Julie" Pendleton
 Audrey Chapman as Sallie "Sally" Mc Bride
 Marshall A. Neilan as Jimmie Mc Bride
 Carrie Clark Ward as Mrs. Semple
 Wesley Barry as Orphan Boy (uncredited)
 True Eames Boardman as Orphan Boy (uncredited)
 Jeanne Carpenter (uncredited)
 Estelle Evans (uncredited)
 Fred Huntley (uncredited)
 Frankie Lee (uncredited)
 Joan Marsh (uncredited)

Accolades
The film is recognized by American Film Institute in these lists:
 2002: AFI's 100 Years...100 Passions – Nominated

Critical review
The plot uses a series of episodes, some separated by time gaps, many humorous, that often pose opposites, like rich and poor or male and female, to advance the story. The treatment of the orphanage is modern and not sentimental, the hard life there is not funny. However, Judy is not an active agent in the story in that, while trying to make the best of her situation, things happen to her beyond her control.

References

External links

Daddy-Long-Legs at silentera.com

1919 films
1919 comedy-drama films
1910s English-language films
American silent feature films
American black-and-white films
Films based on American novels
Films shot in California
Articles containing video clips
First National Pictures films
Films directed by Marshall Neilan
1910s American films
Silent American comedy-drama films